Judge Burke may refer to:

Carol Bush (born 1962), county judge of Ellis County, Texas
John K. Bush (born 1964), judge of the United States Court of Appeals for the Sixth Circuit
Lynn J. Bush (born 1948), judge of the United States Court of Federal Claims